The red-cheeked dunnart (Sminthopsis virginiae) is so called because of the distinctive red hair on its cheek. It is an Australasian marsupial. Its tail is thin and pale pink.

Distribution and habitat 
The red-cheeked dunnart is distributed in Australia and New Guinea.
The nominate subspecies S. v. virginiae occurs in the Queensland around the North Gulf, NE coasts, Mackay to Cape York. 
Subspecies S. v. nitela inhabits the Kimberley's to the top of Northern Territory. Habitat includes woodlands, open rocky forests, savannah grasslands, swamps, soaks and margins of tropical forests.

Social organisation and breeding 
The behaviour of the red-cheecked dunnart, like most Sminthopsis species, is not well known. They breed from October to March. Young are gestated for 15 days and weaned at 65–70 days with maturity by 4–6 months.

Diet 
Its typical diet includes insects and small vertebrates. They quickly learn to avoid the poisonous cane toad.

Subspecies
There are three recognised subspecies of the red-cheeked dunnart:
S. v. virginiae, found in Australia
S. v. nitela, found in Australia
S. v. rufigenis, found in New Guinea

References

External links 
 Australian Biological Resources Study

Dasyuromorphs
Mammals of Western New Guinea
Mammals of Papua New Guinea
Mammals of Queensland
Mammals of Western Australia
Mammals of the Northern Territory
Marsupials of Australia
Mammals described in 1847
Marsupials of New Guinea